Jeanne Bal (May 3, 1928 – April 30, 1996) was an American actress and model who worked primarily in 1960s television.

Early years
A Chicago native, Bal was an only child, the daughter of Joseph Peter Bal (1899–1981), a Monogram Pictures scenic designer, and Bessie Lee  Bozeman  Bal (1902–1967).  She was raised in California, attending high school and junior college in Santa Monica. She worked as a fashion model for a year and a half.

Career
Bal was a regular cast member on the ABC comedy Sid Caesar Invites You (1958). In the 1959–60 season, she featured in the short-lived NBC sitcom Love and Marriage, which ran during the 1959 season, as Pat Baker, the business partner of her father (William Demarest), the founder of a failing music publishing company.

In 1961, Bal became a regular on the sitcom Bachelor Father, but left shortly afterwards. Her other television credits include four appearances on Perry Mason, including the role of Dr. Linda Carey in the 1962 episode, "The Case of the Angry Astronaut", and murder victim Vera Wynne in the 1965 episode, "The Case of the Telltale Tap". In 1963, she guest-starred as Melissa, an overly ambitious saloon girl, on Bonanza in the episode "The Saga of Whizzer McGee." Bal also appeared in guest roles on Wagon Train, Riverboat, and I Spy. In "The Man Trap" (1966), the very first episode of the original Star Trek series, she played a lethal shape-shifting alien which craves salt.

On Mr. Novak Bal portrayed Assistant Vice Principal Jean Pagano during the 1963–64 season. Initially, plans called for increasing her role for the 1964–65 season, promoting her to second billing on the show, but the producer instead cut the number of episodes in which she was to appear. The result was that she left the program.

Bal's first stage appearance came in Gypsy Lady. She also appeared on Broadway in the musical The Gay Life, introducing the song "Why Go Anywhere At All?" During the run, Bal was given a different song to sing in the same spot, "You're Not the Type."

Her other Broadway credits include Call Me Madam (1950), Great to Be Alive! (1950), and Alive and Kicking (1950).
She also toured the United States in productions of Guys and Dolls and South Pacific, among other shows.

Personal life
In October 1953, Bal married Ross Bowman, a stage manager for the show in which she was appearing. In October 1963, she married Edward Richard Lee, an attorney.

Death
Bal died three days before her 68th birthday from metastasized breast cancer.

Filmography

 Matt Lincoln
 episode Nina
 Company of Killers (1970) — as Patricia Cahill
 I Spy
 episode Happy Birthday... Everybody — as Shirl Mathews
 McHale's Navy
 episode The Great Necklace Caper — as Nurse Edith Crawford
 Hey, Landlord
 episode Instant Family — as Leslie Barton
 Star Trek: The Original Series
 episode The Man Trap — as Nancy Crater
 Perry Mason
 episode The Case of the Wrathful Wraith — as Rosemary Welch
 episode The Case of the Telltale Tap — as Vera Wynne
 episode The Case of the Angry Astronaut — as Linda Carey
 episode The Case of the Misguided Missile — as Helen Rand
 Karen
 episode Teacher's Romance — as Georgia Grey
 The Fugitive
 episode Tiger Left, Tiger Right — as Laura Pryor
 Wagon Train
 episode Alias Bill Hawks — as Alice Wells
 Bonanza
 episode The Saga of Whizzer McGee — as Melissa
 The Dick Powell Show
 episode The Third Side of the Coin — as Miriam Kent
 Tales of Wells Fargo
 episode Remember the Yazoo — as Annette Decatur
 Bachelor Father — as Suzanne Collins (1961)
 Checkmate
 episode State of Shock — as Yvonne Lurie
 Route 66
 episode An Effigy in Snow — as Penny Foster
 Boris Karloff's Thriller
 episode Papa Benjamin — as Judy Wilson
 Riverboat
 episode Listen to the Nightingale — as Julie Lang
 Letter to Loretta — Herself/host (1960) (NBC Playhouse version)
 Diagnosis: Unknown
 episode The Parasite — as Dorothy Gordon

References

External links

 
 

1928 births
1996 deaths
American television actresses
Deaths from breast cancer
Actresses from Los Angeles
Deaths from cancer in California
20th-century American actresses